William Fulke (1538buried 28 August 1589) was an English Puritan divine.

Life

He was born in London and educated at St John's College, Cambridge graduating in 1557/58.

After studying law for six years, he became a fellow at St John's College, Cambridge in 1564. He took a leading part in the vestiarian controversy, and persuaded the college to discard the surplice. In consequence, he was expelled from St John's for a time, but in 1567 he became Hebrew lecturer and preacher there.

After standing unsuccessfully for the headship of the college in 1569, he became chaplain to Robert Dudley, 1st Earl of Leicester, and received from him the livings of Warley, in Essex, and Dennington in Suffolk. In 1578 he was elected master of Pembroke Hall, Cambridge.

As a Puritan controversialist he was remarkably active; in 1580 the bishop of Ely appointed him to defend puritanism against the Roman Catholics, Thomas Watson, ex-Bishop of Lincoln (1513–1584), and John Feckenham, formerly abbot of Westminster, and in 1581 he was one of the disputants with the Jesuit, Edmund Campion, while in 1582 he was among the clergy selected by the privy council to argue against any Roman Catholic.

Works

His numerous polemical writings include A Defense of the Sincere and True Translations of the Holy Scriptures into the English tongue, against the Manifold Cavils, Frivolous Quarrels, and Impudent Slanders of Gregory Martin, one of the Readers of Popish Divinity, in the Traitorous Seminary of Rheims (London, 1583), and confutations of Thomas Stapleton (1535–1598), William Allen and other Roman Catholic controversialists.

Fulke published a parallel Bible (AKJV-Douay-Rheims) with a confutation, amidst the controversy with the papists over Bible translation and the Vulgate tradition. The Bible was entitled, The Text of the New Testament of Jesus Christ, Translated out of the Vulgar Latin ... Whereunto is added the Translation out of the Original Greek, Commonly Used in the Church of England.

Accordin with Dictionary of National Biography, 1885-1900/Fulke, William, he create 2 of First matematic games:

- Metromachia (séc. XVI)

- Ouranomachia (séc. XVI)

One To teach geometry and another, astronomy

References

External links

 
 Exposit 
16th-century English Puritan ministers
1538 births
1589 deaths
16th-century English writers
16th-century male writers
16th-century English theologians
English Calvinist and Reformed theologians
16th-century Calvinist and Reformed theologians
Clergy from London
Fellows of Pembroke College, Cambridge
Masters of Pembroke College, Cambridge
Fellows of St John's College, Cambridge
Alumni of St John's College, Cambridge
Vice-Chancellors of the University of Cambridge
16th-century Anglican theologians ion Matematic Games over time, Lisboa museumhttps://www.museus.ulisboa.pt/en/node/183